Kesling is a surname. Notable people with the surname include:

Harold Kesling (1901–1979), American orthodontist
Laura Ann Kesling (born 2000), American actress
Peter Kesling (born 1932), American orthodontist, son of Harold
William Kesling (1899–1983), American architect